The Westminster Warriors are a basketball club based in the Westminster area of London.  The club currently has a senior Men's team competing in the English Basketball League (EBL) Division 1, in addition to a senior Women's team playing in the local London league and junior teams at Under-14, Under-16 and Under-18 levels.  The club are based at Moberly Sports Centre, and take pride in having developed 5 Senior Men's England Internationals from within a  radius of their home venue.

History
The club were originally formed in 1987 as a community basketball programme, focusing on using basketball as the core of a wider personal development mission, and developing a proud tradition of positively impacting the lives of young people from the local community.  The club soon put out a competitive senior Men's team, and enjoyed a long and successful period in the former National Basketball League, working their way up to the pinnacle of Division One before the senior teams were disbanded in 2005 in order to focus on youth development.

The senior Men's team was reinstated in 2007, and began the slow process of working their way back to the heights reached by the former team.  Starting in English Basketball League (EBL) Division 4 (Midlands / South), the Warriors won the Division Four title at the first attempt and then followed this up with a victory in the Division 3 playoffs the following year, clinching back-to-back promotions in their first two seasons back in the league.  While Division Two proved a sterner test, the Warriors claimed second place in the 2011 Division Two playoffs to claim a further promotion back to Division One, claiming a place once again among the elite of English basketball.

Season-by-season records

References

External links
Official Westminster Warriors website

Basketball teams in England